Arctia aulica, the brown tiger moth, is a moth of the family Erebidae. The species was first described by Carl Linnaeus in his 1758 10th edition of Systema Naturae. It is found in the temperate areas of central Europe up to the area surrounding the Amur River to the east and up to the Balkans and the Black Sea to the south.

The wingspan is 34–38 mm. The moth flies from May to July depending on the location.

The larvae feed on various plants, including Achillea, Hieracium, Euphorbia, Knautia and Taraxacum species.

This species, along with the others of the genus Hyphoraia, was moved to Arctia as a result of phylogenetic research published by Rönkä et al. in 2016.

References

External links

 Museum Stockholm
 Moths and Butterflies of Europe and North Africa
 Fauna Europaea
 Lepiforum e.V.

Arctiina
Moths described in 1758
Moths of Japan
Moths of Europe
Moths of Asia
Taxa named by Carl Linnaeus